"Pills & Automobiles" is a song written and performed by American singer Chris Brown featuring American rappers Yo Gotti, A Boogie wit da Hoodie, and Kodak Black. Production was handled by OG Parker, The Martianz and Smash David. The song was released through RCA Records on August 4, 2017, as the fourth single from Brown's eighth studio album, Heartbreak on a Full Moon (2017).

"Pills & Automobiles" received positive reviews from music critics, that complimented the song catchiness and its production, noting it as a detachment from Brown standard R&B type of music, adapting his skills into trap music. In the United States, "Pills & Automobiles" reached number 16 on the Hot R&B/Hip-Hop Songs chart, and number 46 on the Billboard Hot 100 chart, and was certified triple platinum by the Recording Industry Association of America (RIAA).

Its music video, shot at Splash Kingdom Waterpark, in California, was released on August 25, 2017, and displays a large pool party, where Brown and his dancing crew showcase some dancing choreographies.

Background and recording 
In early May 2017, the singer announced the initial Heartbreak on a Full Moon tracklist, and the song was not among the 40 songs announced, but the album's release was later postponed. Subsequently, Brown, Yo Gotti, A Boogie wit da Hoodie and Kodak Black met after the concert organized by the American radio Hot 97, called "HOT 97 Summer Jam 2017", on June 12, 2017, and made the song, over a production done by  OG Parker, The Martianz and Smash David. In July 2017, he announced the pending release of upcoming singles from his album, then releasing "Pills & Automobiles" and "Questions" as anticipation singles from the album.

Composition and lyrics 
"Pills & Automobiles" is a trap up-tempo song, that runs for 4 minutes and 52 seconds, produced by OG Parker, The Martianz and Smash David, where each artist on the track performs one verse, with Brown doing a chorus that starts with the repetition of the word "wet", and ends alternating ad-libs with a mumbled "I'm just tryna change your life". Brown's voice in the track is edited with Auto-Tune, making it sound "ghosty" in his rapped verse, according to Brad Wete of Billboard. In the song, the artists talk about their relationship with reckless women.

Critical reception
Writing for Billboard, Nerisha Penrose felt Brown's "vocals are bathed in Auto-Tune as he sings about getting high and having multiple women" and "leads into the song's catchy hook". Lindsey India of XXL hears Brown "in his trap music element, spitting some catchy, melodic rhymes over a candy-synthed club-friendly beat", and felt "Gotti comes in with a signature verse of his own, while A Boogie and Kodak provide some of their own crooning towards the end". Complex reviewers found the song to be a detachment from "Brown's classic yearning R&B music", noting that the artist "taking a risk, he put aside his well-known singing talent, to try his hand into druggy autotuned trap music, and the result is surprisingly good, even if it doesn't represent his musical heights".

Music video
The accompanying music video was released on August 25, 2017. It was filmed in Splash Kingdom Waterpark, in California, where the visual for Justin Bieber's 2012 song "Beauty and a Beat" was also filmed. It shows Brown and his dancers dancing in a shallow pool, intercut with scenes of women twerking. Gotti came on the scene surrounded by women. A Boogie later hopped into the pool and sat on an inflatable float as he raps, while Black had a party elsewhere and rides a dirt bike. "No one knew it was shot and that Chris Brown was on site that day," said Pamela Kennedy, a representative for park owners. "We understand the importance, especially for videographers and artists, to provide a suitable environment to shoot and do their craft."

Track listing 
Digital download
"Pills & Automobiles" (featuring Yo Gotti, A Boogie wit da Hoodie and Kodak Black) – 4:52

Charts

Weekly charts

Year-end charts

Certifications

References

2017 singles
2017 songs
Chris Brown songs
Yo Gotti songs
A Boogie wit da Hoodie songs
Kodak Black songs
RCA Records singles
Songs written by Chris Brown
Songs written by Yo Gotti
Songs written by A Boogie wit da Hoodie
Songs written by Kodak Black
Songs written by Smash David
Songs written by OG Parker
Song recordings produced by OG Parker